Diogo António Cupido Gonçalves (born 6 February 1997) is a Portuguese professional footballer who plays as a winger for Danish Superliga club F.C. Copenhagen.

Club career
Born in Almodôvar, Gonçalves started his career at local club CD Almodôvar in 2005. Two years later, he joined Ferreiras, before moving to Benfica's youth system in 2008.

After being promoted from the youth team, Gonçalves debuted for the reserve team, Benfica B, as a substitute, playing 20 minutes in a Segunda Liga 4–1 home win over Oliveirense on 14 February 2015. On 24 May, he scored his first goal for Benfica B in a 2–1 home win over Vitória de Guimarães B. Five days later, he scored the only goal of a friendly held for the opening of FC United of Manchester's Broadhurst Park.

On 9 August 2017, Gonçalves debuted for Benfica's senior team in a 3–1 victory over Braga in the Primeira Liga. Later on, he made his UEFA Champions League debut in a 1–0 home loss to Manchester United on 18 October.

On 14 June 2018, Gonçalves joined EFL Championship club Nottingham Forest on loan for the 2018–19 season with the option of making the transfer permanent at the end of the season. He made his only Championship start in the opening day 1–1 draw at Bristol City and was subsequently used sparingly by managers Aitor Karanka and Martin O'Neill, totalling ten games in all.

Gonçalves and Benfica teammate Gonçalo Rodrigues both moved on 26 June 2019 to Famalicão, who were returning to the Primeira Liga after a quarter-century away; his deal was again a season-long loan. He scored his first goal on 19 December in a 3–0 home win over Mafra to reach the quarter-finals of the Taça de Portugal; there on 15 January 2020 he netted the only goal at Paços de Ferreira to put the team from Vila Nova de Famalicão into the last four for the first time since 1946.

In August 2020, Gonçalves renewed his contract until 2025.

On 5 January 2023, Gonçalves signed a four-year contract with Danish Superliga side F.C. Copenhagen.

International career
Gonçalves has represented Portugal at various levels up to under-21 level.

Career statistics

Honours
Benfica U19
 UEFA Youth League runner-up: 2016–17

Benfica
Supertaça Cândido de Oliveira: 2017
Taça de Portugal runner-up: 2020–21
Taça da Liga runner-up: 2021–22

References

External links

 Profile at the F.C. Copenhagen website
 
 National team data 

1997 births
Living people
People from Almodôvar
Portuguese footballers
Portuguese expatriate footballers
Association football forwards
Sportspeople from Beja District
Portugal youth international footballers
Portugal under-21 international footballers
S.L. Benfica B players
S.L. Benfica footballers
Nottingham Forest F.C. players
F.C. Famalicão players
F.C. Copenhagen players
Liga Portugal 2 players
Primeira Liga players
English Football League players
Portuguese expatriate sportspeople in England
Portuguese expatriate sportspeople in Denmark
Expatriate footballers in England
Expatriate men's footballers in Denmark